This article is a list of Acacia species (sensu lato) that are known to contain psychoactive alkaloids, or are suspected of containing such alkaloids due to being psychoactive. The presence and constitution of alkaloids in nature can be highly variable, due to environmental and genetic factors.

Acacias known to contain psychoactive alkaloids

Acacia species having little or no alkaloids in the material sampled 
Species containing a concentration of alkaloids of 0-0.02% include:
 Acacia acinacea
 Acacia baileyana
 Acacia decurrens
 Acacia dealbata
 Acacia mearnsii
 Acacia drummondii
 Acacia elata
 Acacia falcata
 Acacia leprosa
 Acacia linearis
 Acacia melanoxylon
 Acacia retinodes
 Acacia saligna
 Acacia stricta
 Acacia verticillata
 Acacia visco
 Acacia vestita

See also 

 Entheogenic drugs and the archaeological record
 List of plants used for smoking
 List of psychoactive plants
 List of psychoactive plants, fungi, and animals
 N,N-Dimethyltryptamine
 Psilocybin mushrooms
 Psychoactive cacti

External links 
 Comprehensive list of Acacia species, split by subgenus
 Kada - 'Acacia confusa of Taiwan'
 r/AcaciaTrees subreddit
 World Wide Wattle

References

Acacia species, psychoactive alkaloids
psychoactive alkaloids